National Security Council of the Republic of Serbia is the state body of Serbia which considers issues of importance for national security and directs the works of the security services. The Law on the Fundamentals of Organizing Security Services from 2007 legally defined the work of this body.

Formation 
Before the council was established in today's form, there were several unsuccessful attempts to form a body to bring together key decision-makers in the security sector. In 2000, the FRY government formed the Defense and Security Council, headed by the then prime minister and defence minister, but the body did not interfere in the affairs of the Supreme Defense Council, but was of an advisory nature.

The next attempt was the establishment of the State Security Council by a decree of the government of Zoran Đinđić, but it did not last long either. The first government of Vojislav Koštunica established such a council in January 2006 with a decree in order to establish better coordination of the work of the secret services, but this council never met.

The term National Security Council was first used in 2006. In 2006, the Government of Serbia decided to form a council, which was formally established in May 2007, following the adoption of the Law on the Fundamentals of Security Services.

Composition 
The National Security Council is chaired by the president of Serbia, and includes:

 President of Serbia
 Prime Minister of Serbia
 Minister of Defence
 Minister of Internal Affairs
 Minister of Justice
 Director of the Security Intelligence Agency
 Director of the Military Security Agency
 Director of the Military Intelligence Agency
 Secretary of the National Security Council

Sessions of the Council are convened by the president of Serbia, at least once every three months, and more often if necessary. The agenda is determined by the president together with the prime minister. If the president is prevented and unable to chair, the prime minister takes office.

The president may, on his own initiative, or on the initiative of one of the members, invite to a meeting the heads of state bodies and institutions, or some other persons who are not members of the council. All conclusions and other acts that are passed are signed personally by the president of the republic.

Secretary of the National Security Council 
The secretary of the National Security Council participates in the work of the Council, but has no right to decide. Its main function is to ensure the implementation of all Council conclusions. With the arrival of the new government, the Law on the Fundamentals of Security Services was changed, and it was prescribed that the president appoint and dismiss the secretary of the National Security Council.

Office of the National Security Council 
The Office of the National Security Council performs professional and administrative tasks for the needs of the Council, and in particular:
 Affairs related to convening and preparing the sessions of the Council
 professional work related to monitoring the implementation of the guidelines and conclusions of the Council
 administrative and technical support to the Coordination Bureau
 keeping and making available to the members of the Council reports and other acts of the Council

Roles of the National Security Council 
All roles and powers of the council are prescribed by the Law on the Fundamentals of Security Services. All roles of the council are mainly reduced to the coordination of the elements of the security sector - the army, the police and the security services. The following are the roles of the National Security Council:
 It takes care of national security by addressing security issues
 Coordinates the work of state bodies that make up the security sector and considers measures to improve national security
 Directs and coordinates the work of security services by reviewing intelligence and security assessments and making conclusions regarding the work of security services and the Bureau for Coordination of Security Services
 Determines priorities and ways of protection and directs the realization of national interests that are carried out by performing intelligence and security activities
 Directs and coordinates the work of security services
 Gives the Government an opinion on the budget proposals of the security services, on the proposals of the annual and medium-term work plans of the security services, as well as on the proposal for the appointment and dismissal of the heads of the security services
 Takes care of the harmonized application of regulations and standards for the protection of personal data, as well as other regulations that protect human rights that may be endangered by the exchange of information or other operational activities

References 

Politics of Serbia
National security councils
Serbian intelligence agencies